Ngāti Hinerangi is a Māori iwi of New Zealand.

See also
List of Māori iwi

References